Prionocris is a genus of moths of the family Oecophoridae.

Species
Prionocris acmaea  (Meyrick, 1888)
Prionocris charodes  (Lower, 1920)
Prionocris complanula  (Turner, 1896)
Prionocris mollis (Turner, 1946)
Prionocris phylacopis  (Meyrick, 1888)
Prionocris protoxantha  (Meyrick, 1883)
Prionocris rhodopepla  (Lower, 1903)

References

Markku Savela's ftp.funet.fi

 
Oecophorinae
Moth genera